World Psychiatry is a peer-reviewed medical journal covering research in the area of psychiatry. It is the official publication of the World Psychiatric Association. It is published by Wiley-Blackwell and the editor-in-chief is Mario Maj.

Abstracting and indexing
According to the Journal Citation Reports, the journal has a 2021 impact factor of 79.683. It is ranked no. 1 out of 155 journals in the category Psychiatry and no. 1 out of 3,414 journals in the Social Sciences Citation Index category.

The journal is abstracted and indexed in PubMed, Current Contents/Clinical Medicine, Current Contents/Social and Behavioral Sciences, Science Citation Index Expanded, and Embase.

In addition to the English edition, the journal is also available in Arabic, Chinese, French, Russian, Spanish and Turkish.

See also
 List of psychiatry journals

References

External links
 

Multilingual journals
Psychiatry journals
Publications established in 2002
Triannual journals
Wiley-Blackwell academic journals
World Psychiatric Association